Fetraomby is a village and rural commune in the Brickaville district (or: Vohibinany (district)) in Atsinanana, Madagascar.

The village can be accessed by following the Rianila River by canoe.

Economy
The economy is based on agriculture. Rice and coffee are grown in Fetraomby.
The Sahamamy graphite mine has operated there since 2019.

Population
Betsimisaraka

References

Populated places in Atsinanana